The following is a list of episodes for the television sitcom Head of the Class. The series premiered on September 17, 1986, on ABC, and ended on June 25, 1991. A total of 114 episodes were produced spanning five seasons.

Series overview

Episodes

Season 1 (1986–87)

Season 2 (1987–88)

Season 3 (1988–89)

Season 4 (1989–90)

Season 5 (1990–91)

References

External links
 
 

Head of the Class
Head of the Class